is a train station operated by Meitetsu's  Tokoname Line located in Minami Ward, Nagoya, Aichi Prefecture,  Japan. It is located 5.3 rail kilometers from the terminus of the line at Jingū-mae Station. The station provides access to Daido University.

History
The Aichi Electric Railway became part of the Meitetsu group on August 1, 1935. The station was renamed to its present name on June 1, 1945. Express train service was discontinued from 1990. From 2004–2006, the tracks were elevated. On July 1, 2006, the Tranpass system of magnetic fare cards with automatic turnstiles was implemented, and the station has been unattended since that point. Express services were resumed in 2008.

Lines
Meitetsu
Tokoname Line

Platforms
Daidōchō Station has two elevated side platforms.

Adjacent stations

External links
  Meitetsu Station information

References

Railway stations in Aichi Prefecture
Railway stations in Japan opened in 1926
Stations of Nagoya Railroad